Vicente José Matías Vuoso (born 3 November 1981) is a former professional footballer who played as a striker. Born in Argentina, he represented the Mexico national team.

Born in Mar del Plata, Vuoso began his career at Independiente in 2000, then transferring to English club Manchester City in 2002, where he did not play in a single league match. Since 2003 he has played in Mexico, having two stints with Santos Laguna and Club América, as well as playing for Atlas and Chiapas.

Vuoso chose to represent Mexico at international level, making his debut in 2008 and featured for them at the 2015 Copa América.

Club career

Early career 

Matías Vuoso began his career in the Argentine Primera División with Independiente.  Playing alongside Diego Forlán, Vicente scored seven goals in 29 games for Independiente in 2000–01 and another seven in 35 games in 2001–02.  He left the Argentinian club in June 2002 to sign with English club Manchester City, joining for £3.5 million. However, Vuoso did not appear in a single game for Manchester City, and was subsequently loaned out to Santos Laguna for the 2003–04 season.

Santos Laguna

Despite moving from the Premier League to the Primera Division Mexicana, in the beginning of his stay in Mexico, Vuoso experienced the same problems at Santos Laguna that he faced at Manchester City. Coming to a club that already boasted an attack that featured Chilean playmaker Rodrigo Ruiz and Mexican striker Jared Borgetti, Vuoso was exclusively played as a substitute during the first part of the Apertura 2003 season. As fate would have it however, Vuoso was thrown into the starting mix when Borgetti suffered a minor injury that required a two-week absence from the pitch. Vuoso scored in both of the games he started in place of Borgetti and subsequently convinced Santos manager Luis Fernando Tena, who awarded Vuoso a starting spot.

After Jared Borgetti's exit from Santos Laguna following the Clausura 2004 season, Vuoso became Santos Laguna's main goalscoring threat and teammate Rodrigo Ruiz's primary target for his passes. Vuoso exploded with 11 goals in 17 games for Santos in the Apertura 2004 campaign and then followed that up with 16 goals in 19 games the following season.

América

Newly appointed América manager Luis Fernando Tena brought Vuoso to the club as a reinforcement for the Apertura 2006 campaign. Following the club's  semi-final defeat, Vuoso was sold back to Santos. He only managed to score 5 goals in 20 league matches for América.

Return to Santos Laguna

Vuoso was bought by Santos Laguna again after Clausura 2007 for an undisclosed amount of money. Upon his return, a loss of form kept Vuoso on the bench. However, Vuoso would later become a key player in Santos Laguna's 2008 Clausura championship campaign.

However, during the finals of the Clausura 2010, he failed to score twice in two important plays during the second game against Toluca and made that Santos were meant to play extra-time and penalty shots. In the penalty shots he was the fourth player and failed to score his penalty shot allowing Toluca to get the championship.

After this game, Vuoso was transferred to Club America.

Return to América

For the Apertura 2010 season, he signed with América, which would be his second stint with the club. In his first season with América, he scored 8 goals, helping América reach the semi-finals, being defeated by his ex-club Santos.

Atlas

América sold Vuoso to Atlas de Guadalajara for the Apertura 2012 tournament. He scored 10 goals in over 50 matches played with Atlas.

Loan to Chiapas

Atlas loaned Vuoso to Chiapas F.C. for the Apertura 2014.

Cruz Azul
On 25 July 2015, Cruz Azul announced the signing of Vuoso for the Apertura 2015. During this time, Vuoso was a free agent.

International career 

Upon receiving his Mexican citizenship, Vuoso said that if Hugo Sánchez, former coach of the Mexico national team, ever needed a striker, he would be honored to wear the green jersey  while helping the country of his new home win. On 3 August 2008 Mexico coach and former Manchester City manager Sven-Göran Eriksson had Matias Vuoso, the second naturalized striker on the Mexico squad, replace Omar Arellano who injured himself days before. His debut came when he came on as a substitute in a 3–0 win over Jamaica at the Azteca stadium.

On 15 October 2008, Vuoso scored his first goal with the team against Canada with a header. The game was a World Cup Qualifier Match. On 12 November 2008, Vuoso scored a last minute goal for Mexico to win over Ecuador 2–1. On 11 March 2009, he scored again twice against Bolivia, in a game that ended 5–1.

On 11 May 2015, Vuoso was called up to participate in the 2015 Copa América. He would make world football headlines by scoring a memorable brace in what was a surprising tie against Chile whom were the eventual Copa America winners.

International goals 
Scores and results list Mexico's goal tally first, score column indicates score after each Vuoso goal.

Personal life 
During his time with Manchester City, he, along with players Daniel Van Buyten and Djamel Belmadi, were the victim of a theft by two bankers. In total, workers at the Co-operative Bank stole more than £350,000 from the accounts of the three players. In January 2006, the bank workers, Paul Sherwood, a cashier, and Paul Hanley, his supervisor, were jailed for 32 months and 12 months respectively.

Honours

Santos Laguna
 Primera División de México: Clausura 2008

Individual
 Primera División de México Top Scorer: Clausura 2005, Apertura 2005

References

External links 
 Guardian statistics
 Argentine Primera statistics at Fútbol XXI  
 
 Article on Vuoso's stay at Man City
 

Argentine emigrants to Mexico
Naturalized citizens of Mexico
Mexican footballers
Mexico international footballers
Argentine people of Spanish descent
Argentine people of Italian descent
Club Atlético Independiente footballers
Manchester City F.C. players
Santos Laguna footballers
Club América footballers
Atlas F.C. footballers
Talleres de Córdoba footballers
Cruz Azul footballers
Correcaminos UAT footballers
Expatriate footballers in England
Argentine Primera División players
Liga MX players
Association football forwards
1981 births
Living people
2015 Copa América players
Sportspeople from Mar del Plata